The Mochi are a  Hindu caste found mainly in North India. They are the traditional shoemakers of South Asia.

History and origin
Historically, the community was involved in the manufacture of protective leather crafts.

Gangaramji Dhuldhoye worked for their upliftment in Central India.

Present circumstances

In Gujarat, the Mochi caste is categorised as OBC in Bakshi Panch.

The Mochi are involved in the manufacture of leather shoes. The community has a traditional caste council, as is common among many North Indian  artisan communities. This caste council acts as an instrument of social control, by punishing those who contravene community norms. Each caste council is headed by a Chaudhary, a position that tends to be hereditary. The Mochi live in multi-caste villages, but occupy their own distinct quarters.

The Mochi of Haryana claim to have migrated from Rajasthan, and are found mainly in the cantonment city of Ambala. They still speak the Braj Bhasha dialect. They are strictly endogamous, and practice clan exogamy. Their traditional occupation was shoe making, but with the spread of factory manufactured shoes it has declined. A large number are landless agricultural labourers, with a minority now taking up other professions. They are assigned as scheduled caste  and supported by  affirmative action.

Mochi of Punjab

In Punjab, the members of the Mochi caste are those involved with the working in tanned leather as opposed to a tanner, an occupation associated with the Chamar. Most Mochi are still found in rural Punjab, although there is a steady immigration to the towns and cities, as their traditional occupation is in decline. They are one of the most widespread castes in Punjab, found in almost every district. Most Mochi in pre partition Punjab had converted to Islam, and these Muslim Mochis left at the time of the partition of India in 1947. The remaining community is largely Hindu and Sikh. The community has now been granted Scheduled Caste status, which allows it to access a number of affirmative actions programmes initiated by the Government of India.

The Mochi in rural Punjab in Pakistan is still dependent on the local landlord, who acts as patron. Often, the Mochi does not own his property, but rents from the landlord. The Mochi is thus entirely dependent on the locally dominant caste, and are paid from each cash crop at the end of the harvesting season according to a system called seypi. Presently, many Mochis are no longer involved in their traditional occupation of shoemaking. Many are now landless agricultural labourers. Overall, the condition of the Mochi community in Punjab has worsened. There has been a marked shift towards manufactured shoes, which has seen a severe decline in their traditional occupation. Many of their patrons from the locally dominant castes such as the Muslim Jats no longer pay the traditional seypi. Unlike in India, the Government of Pakistan has not provided any affirmative actions programmes. As such, the Mochi are one of the most vulnerable ethnic communities in Pakistan, and are often victims of societal discrimination.

References

Dalit communities
Shudra castes
Hindu ethnic groups
Hindu communities
Ethnic groups in India
Ethnic groups in Bangladesh
Other Backward Classes of Uttar Pradesh
Scheduled Castes of Maharashtra
Scheduled Castes of Andhra Pradesh
Other Backward Classes of Gujarat
Scheduled Castes of Punjab
Scheduled Castes of Madhya Pradesh
Scheduled Castes of Telangana
Scheduled Castes of Haryana